Nassau Village-Ratliff is a census-designated place (CDP) in Nassau County, Florida, United States. The population was 5,337 at the 2010 census.

Geography
Nassau Village-Ratliff is located at  (30.519362, -81.797327). The main roads through the community are U.S. Routes 1 and 23, though Florida State Road 115 runs through the northeastern edge of the community. The southwestern side is bordered along Thomas Creek Road and the Norfolk Southern Railway Valdosta District.

According to the United States Census Bureau, the CDP has a total area of 14.8 square miles (38.4 km), all land.

Demographics

As of the census of 2000, there were 4,667 people, 1,640 households, and 1,353 families residing in the CDP. The racial makeup of the CDP was 97.45% White, 0.39% African American, 0.56% Native American, 0.28% Asian, 0.15% from other races, and 1.18% from two or more races. Hispanic or Latino of any race were 0.96% of the population.

There were 1,640 households, out of which 38.3% had children under the age of 18 living with them, 68.0% were married couples living together, 8.5% had a female householder with no husband present, and 17.5% were non-families. 13.8% of all households were made up of individuals, and 5.7% had someone living alone who was 65 years of age or older.  The average household size was 2.85 and the average family size was 3.11.

In the CDP, the population was spread out, with 27.0% under the age of 18, 8.1% from 18 to 24, 29.9% from 25 to 44, 25.2% from 45 to 64, and 9.8% who were 65 years of age or older.  The median age was 36 years. For every 100 females, there were 100.6 males.  For every 100 females age 18 and over, there were 98.1 males.

The median income for a household in the CDP was $43,442, and the median income for a family was $46,857. Males had a median income of $35,340 versus $24,924 for females. The per capita income for the CDP was $17,410.  About 5.5% of families and 6.8% of the population were below the poverty line, including 7.4% of those under age 18 and 10.8% of those age 65 or over.

References

Census-designated places in Nassau County, Florida
Census-designated places in the Jacksonville metropolitan area
Census-designated places in Florida